The Brussels Philharmonic is a Belgian radio orchestra located in Brussels. Formerly known as the  Groot Symfonie-Orkest, BRT Philharmonic Orchestra, and later as the Flemish Radio Orchestra, the orchestra has been linked to the Flemish public broadcaster NIR/INR (the present VRT).

History
The orchestra was founded in 1935 as a studio ensemble of public broadcasting with the name of Groot Symfonie-Orkest. In 1998, it began its independent existence as the VRT Radio Orkest (Flemish Radio Orchestra). From 2008, the orchestra took the new name of the Brussels Philharmonic.

Description
Since 2005, the residence of the orchestra has been Studio 4 of the renovated Flagey Building in Brussels. The orchestra also gives concerts in the BOZAR, Centre for Fine Arts.  The orchestra also plays elsewhere in Flanders, as well as abroad in London, Vienna and Tokyo. The orchestra also performs as accompanying ensemble with the Royal Ballet of Flanders.

The orchestra's current music director is Stéphane Denève, as of the 2015–2016 season.  One new initiative scheduled for Denève's tenure is the establishment of CffOR (Centre for Future Orchestral Repertoire), for commissioning new compositions.  With the orchestra, Denève has commercially recorded music of Guillaume Connesson, and Sergei Prokofiev.  In 2017, the orchestra and Denève accompanied the finale of the Queen Elisabeth Competition for cello. In March 2019, the orchestra made its debut at Carnegie Hall in New York under the baton of Denève.  In September 2020, the orchestra started live-streaming its concerts in Brussels in collaboration with MotorMusic and Evil Penguin TV.  Denève is scheduled to conclude his music directorship of the orchestra at the close of the 2021-2022 season.

In 2021, Kazushi Ōno first guest-conducted the orchestra. In September 2021, the orchestra announced the appointment of Ōno as its next music director, effective with the 2022-2023 season.  In February 2022, the orchestra announced the appointment of Ilan Volkov as principal guest conductor, effective with the 2022–2023 season, following three guest-conducting appearances with the orchestra, the first in March 2021.

Music Directors
 Fernand Terby (1978–1988)
 Alexander Rahbari (1988–1996)
 Frank Shipway (1996–2001)
 Yoel Levi (2001–2007)
 Michel Tabachnik (2008–2015)
 Stéphane Denève (2015–2022)
 Kazushi Ōno (2022–present)

Selected recordings
CD series include CDs for Warner Classics and recordings for the French center of Romantic music, Palazzetto Bru Zane. The orchestra has notably recorded the scores for The Aviator, composed by Howard Shore, and The Artist, composed by Ludovic Bource. The orchestra received the Choc de Classica and the Diapason d'or of the year in 2016 for their Deutsche Grammophon recording of music of Guillaume Connesson, 'Pour sortir au jour'.

Since 2015, the Brussels Philharmonic has made several recordings for Deutsche Grammophon.
 Connesson – Pour sortir au jour | Brussels Philharmonic & Mathieu Dufour conducted by Stéphane Denève, (2016)
 Prokofiev – Romantic Suites  | Brussels Philharmonic conducted by Stéphane Denève, (2017)
 Connesson – Lost Horizon | Brussels Philharmonic & Renaud Capuçon & Timothy McAllister conducted by Stéphane Denève, (2017)
Voice of Hope | Brussels Philharmonic & Camille Thomas conducted by Stéphane Denève, (2020)

Since 2011, the Brussels Philharmonic has been producing recordings through its own label, Brussels Philharmonic Recordings.
 Debussy – La Mer | Brussels Philharmonic & het Vlaams Radio Koor conducted by Michel Tabachnik, (Brussels Philharmonic Recordings, March 2011)
 Dvorák – Symphony No. 9 | Brussels Philharmonic & Michel Tabachnik, (Brussels Philharmonic Recordings, February 2012)
 Tchaikovsky – Symphony No. 6  | Brussels Philharmonic & Michel Tabachnik, (Brussels Philharmonic Recordings, September 2012)
 Stravinsky – Le sacre du printemps | Brussels Philharmonic & Michel Tabachnik, (Brussels Philharmonic Recordings, January 2013)

Scorings 
 2004 – The Aviator
 2011 – The Artist
 2012 – Parade's End
 2013 – The White Queen 
 2015 – High Rise
 2015 – Marguerite
 2015 – Michiel de Ruyter
 2016 – A Quiet Passion
 2016 – Knielen op een bed violen
 2017 – Get Even (game)
 2017 – Final Fantasy XV: Episode Ignis (game)
 2018 – El árbol de la sangre

References

External links
 Brussels Philharmonic official website
 
Stéphane Denève official website
 Flagey Cultural Centre

1935 establishments in Belgium
Musical groups established in 1935
Belgian orchestras
Organisations based in Brussels
Music in Brussels